Tetrataenium is a genus of flowering plants belonging to the family Apiaceae.

Its native range is Turkey to Central Asia and Indo-China.

Species:

Tetrataenium aquilegifolium 
Tetrataenium birmanicum 
Tetrataenium bivittatum 
Tetrataenium canescens 
Tetrataenium cardiocarpum 
Tetrataenium ceylanicum 
Tetrataenium grande 
Tetrataenium hookerianum 
Tetrataenium kumaonense 
Tetrataenium lallii 
Tetrataenium lasiopetalum 
Tetrataenium leucocarpum 
Tetrataenium nepalense 
Tetrataenium nephrophyllum 
Tetrataenium olgae 
Tetrataenium rigens 
Tetrataenium sprengelianum 
Tetrataenium sublineare 
Tetrataenium wallichii 
Tetrataenium yunnanense

References

Apioideae
Apioideae genera
Taxa named by Augustin Pyramus de Candolle